Waldersee is a surname. Notable people with the surname include:

 Alfred von Waldersee (1832–1904), German field marshal
 Friedrich Graf von Waldersee (1795–1864), German Prussian Lieutenant General and military author
 Georg von Waldersee (1860–1932), Imperial German Army general in World War I

German-language surnames
Military families of Germany